Jenny Hill is an Australian politician, currently serving as the Mayor of Townsville, which is the 18th largest local government area in Australia. She was elected to the position during the Queensland Local Government elections held on 28 April 2012. Prior to serving as mayor, Hill was a city councillor and previously held the position of Deputy Mayor under the previous pre-amalgamation Townsville City Council in the Labor administration of Tony Mooney between 2007 and 2008.

Hill came to Townsville as the fiancée of a soldier in 1982. She worked as a scientist, and later received a master's degree in public health.

She was first elected to the Townsville City Council in 1997. She is a member of the Labor Party.

Hill also ran as the Labor Party candidate for the federal seat of Herbert in the 2001 federal election. She was defeated by the then incumbent Liberal member, Peter Lindsay.

In 2020 Cr Hill was charged with driving without due care and attention causing death following a fatal collision with a motorcycle on 30 January 2020. She was found not guilty in August 2021. The court heard that the motorcyclist was on methamphetamine at the time, ran a red light, and was driving above the legal speed limit at the time of the crash.

References

Living people
Mayors of Townsville
Women mayors of places in Queensland
Australian Labor Party mayors
Queensland local councillors
Year of birth missing (living people)
Women local councillors in Australia
Labor Right politicians